Tana Qirqos (variantly spelled Tana Kirkos; also called Tana Chirqos or Tana Chirkos, etc.; Ge'ez: ጣና ቂርቆስ ṭānā qirqos, ጣና ጪርቆስ ṭānā č̣irqos) is an island in the eastern part of Lake Tana in Ethiopia, near the mouth of the Gumara River, having a latitude and longitude of . It is considered a holy island, and only monks of the Ethiopian Church live there.

The monks believe that the island was once the resting place of the Ark of the Covenant. According to tradition, the Ark was placed there by Emperor Ezana, the first Ethiopian sovereign to convert to Christianity, and it remained on the island until it was transported to Mary of Zion church in Axum.  

Graham Hancock has speculated that the Ark was carried from Elephantine by the Jewish garrison on the island, around the 5th century BC. However, there is no legend or tradition that supports this idea and specialists consider it unfounded.

When R.E. Cheesman visited Tana Qirqos in 1933, he found a large stratum of rock at the northern end of the island, which looked "like a huge wall of masonry" 400 or 500 yards long and standing about 100 feet high. He recorded that the formation "has been identified as olivine-bearing basalt," and that "in all probability the island gives its name to the lake."

References 

Amhara Region
Islands of Lake Tana
Christian holy places
Ethiopian Orthodox Tewahedo Church